Sir Michael Edwards, OBE (born 29 April 1938) is an Anglo-French poet and academic.

Life
Born in Barnes, SW London,  Edwards was educated at Kingston Grammar School and Christ's College, Cambridge, where he read French and Spanish. He wrote his doctoral thesis on Jean Racine, completing it in Paris. He was the longtime Professor of English and Comparative Literature at the University of Warwick until 2002, when he was elected to a professorial chair for the Study of Literary Creation in the English Language at the Collège de France.

Edwards was elected to one of the 40 seats in the Académie Française on 21 February 2013, becoming the first English person to be so honoured. He had been nominated previously in 2008, when he received the second highest number of votes in the fourth and final round of voting (eight votes, behind Michel Schneider who received 10) but since no candidate secured a majority the seat then remained vacant.

Honours
Knighted in the 2014 New Year Honours for "services to British–French cultural relations", Sir Michael has received the following honours:

  Chevalier de la Légion d'honneur 
  Commandeur de l'ordre des Arts et des Lettres
  OBE
  Knight Bachelor

Bibliography 
 La tragédie racinienne, La pensée universelle, 1972
 To Kindle the Starling, Aquila, 1972
 Eliot/Language, Aquila, 1975
 Éloge de l'attente, Belin, 1996
 De Poetica Christiana, Hermeuneutikai Kutatokozpont, Budapest, 1997
 Beckett ou le don des langues, Espaces 34, 1998
 Leçons de poésie, PUF, 2001
 De la poésie, avec Yves Bonnefoy, Presses Universitaires de Vincennes, 2001
 Ombres de lune : réflexions sur la création littéraire, Espaces 34, 2001
 Un monde même et autre, Desclée de Brouwer, janvier 2002
 Rivage mobile, Arfuyen, 2003
 Terre de poésie, Espaces 34, 2003
 Shakespeare et la comédie de l'émerveillement, Desclée de Brouwer, 2003
 Racine et Shakespeare, PUF, 2004
 Shakespeare et l'œuvre de la tragédie, Belin, 2005
 Le Génie de la poésie anglaise, Le Livre de poche, 2006
 De l'émerveillement, Fayard, 2008
 À la racine du feu, Caractères, coll. Planètes, 2009
 Shakespeare : Le poète au théâtre, Fayard, 2009
 Le bonheur d'être ici, Fayard, février 2011
 Le rire de Molière, De Fallois, octobre 2012
 Paris aubaine, Éditions de Corlevour, novembre 2012

References

1938 births
Living people
People from Barnes, London
People educated at Kingston Grammar School
Alumni of Christ's College, Cambridge
Academics of the University of Warwick
Academic staff of the Collège de France
Members of the Académie Française
English expatriates in France
Chevaliers of the Légion d'honneur
Commandeurs of the Ordre des Arts et des Lettres
Officers of the Order of the British Empire
Knights Bachelor
English male poets